The St. Mary's Catholic Church is a historic church building at 301 W. Highland in Paragould, Arkansas. It  was designed early in the career of Charles Eames, and is one of only two known church designs of his in Arkansas, the other being St. Mary's, Helena. Built in 1935, it is stylistically a modern reinterpretation of Romanesque Revival architecture.  The congregation was organized in 1883; this is its second sanctuary.

The church was listed on the National Register of Historic Places in 1978.

See also
National Register of Historic Places listings in Greene County, Arkansas

References

External links
St. Mary's web site

Roman Catholic churches in Arkansas
Churches in the Roman Catholic Diocese of Little Rock
Churches on the National Register of Historic Places in Arkansas
Buildings and structures in Paragould, Arkansas
National Register of Historic Places in Greene County, Arkansas
Religious organizations established in 1883
Roman Catholic churches completed in 1935
Romanesque Revival church buildings in Arkansas
20th-century Roman Catholic church buildings in the United States